Tenacious D is an American comedy rock band formed in 1994 by Jack Black and Kyle Gass. After starring in their own self-titled television series on HBO, the band released its self-titled debut album in 2001. All tracks on the album were credited to Black and Gass, with the exception of the skit "Friendship Test", written by Bob Odenkirk. For the album, Black and Gass worked with producers the Dust Brothers and a studio band featuring electric guitarist Warren Fitzgerald, bassist Steve McDonald, drummer Dave Grohl and keyboardist Page McConnell, as well as other contributors. "Tribute" and "Wonderboy" were released as singles, and the album reached number 33 on the US Billboard 200. A number of tracks from the album were also featured on The Complete Master Works, the duo's first video album, which also documents a performance in London in 2002.

In 2006 the band released The Pick of Destiny, their second studio album which acts as the soundtrack to their film of the same name. Supported by the single "POD", The Pick of Destiny reached number eight on the Billboard 200, and featured songwriting credits for a range of the album's contributors, including electric guitarist John Konesky, bassist John Spiker and the film's director and co-writer Liam Lynch. The album also saw the return of Dave Grohl on drums, as well as the inclusion of vocalists Meat Loaf and Ronnie James Dio, who both also had brief cameo appearances in the films opening track "Kickapoo". In 2008 the band released its second video album, The Complete Master Works 2, documenting two performances in Seattle, Washington from February 2007. This performance featured a full band composed of Black, Gass, Konesky, Spiker and drummer Brooks Wackerman.

After a 6 year hiatus, Tenacious D returned in 2012 with their third studio album, Rize of the Fenix. Produced by John Kimbrough, who co-wrote two of the album's tracks and performed on four, the album once again featured Dave Grohl on drums, as well as the returning John Konesky on electric guitar and John Spiker on bass. Despite not supporting a film or TV series, like its two predecessors, Rize of the Fenix became the most successful album by the band in terms of chart performance, peaking at number four on the Billboard 200 and number two on the UK Albums Chart. The band also released the EP Jazz later in the year, featuring a jazz composition lasting over 11 minutes.

Outside of the band's own discography, Tenacious D have contributed to a number of other releases. In 2001, Black and Gass collaborated with Sum 41 on the Christmas track "Things I Want", written by Ralph Garman and released on the KROQ-FM album Kevin & Bean Present Swallow My Eggnog, hosted by Kevin & Bean. In 2014 the band also contributed a cover version of the Dio track "The Last in Line" for the tribute album Ronnie James Dio: This Is Your Life.

On November 2, 2018, Tenacious D's fourth studio album "Post-Apocalypto" was released. The album consists of 21 tracks, both songs and skits, which together form the plot to their YouTube animatic series "Tenacious D in Post-Apocalypto". The shows 6 parts were aired weekly as a lead up to the album, the last of which aired on the day of release. All six episodes were later compiled into a single film named "Post-Apocalypto: The Movie".

On November 29, 2019, for Record Store Day/Black Friday, Tenacious D released a 'Blue Series' 7" Single, featuring the track "Don't Blow It, Kage". The record was produced by The White Stripes member, Jack White.

Black has hinted towards there being more material released in the future, saying that the fifth album will take time, and "most likely be released [sometime] after 2020

On October 27th 2020, Tenacious D released a cover of 'Time Warp', available to stream online and also released on 7" vinyl. The song included a music video featuring a string of celebrity guests. The single was used to promote 'Rock the Vote', which encourages Americans to vote in the 2020 Presidential Election. All proceeds from the sale of the song were donated to Rock the Vote.

On July 1, 2021, Tenacious D released the single 'You Never Give Me Your Money / The End'. The song is a medley of the two Beatles songs of the same name. Proceeds from the single go to 'Doctors Without Borders'.

Songs

See also
Tenacious D discography

References

External links
List of Tenacious D songs at AllMusic
Tenacious D official website

Tenacious D